The 2012 W-League grand final was the grand final of the fourth season of the Australian W-League football (soccer) competition. It was contested between premiers Canberra United and second-placed Brisbane Roar at McKellar Park in Canberra on Saturday, 28 January 2012. Canberra United were victorious, winning 3–2.

Match details

See also
W-League records and statistics

References

W League grand final
Grand Final
Soccer in Canberra
A-League Women Grand Finals